The Ferris Formation is a Late Cretaceous (~66 Ma) to Paleocene (66-63 Ma), fluvial-deltaic geological formation in southern Wyoming. It contains a variety of trace and body fossils, preserved in sandy fluvial channel deposits and overbank units.  Dinosaur remains are fragmentary, but include Triceratops, Tyrannosaurus, dromaeosaurids, Paronychodon, Ricardoestesia, Edmontosaurus, Edmontonia, Ankylosaurus, and Pachycephalosaurus.

Some of the fluvial channels contain evidence of tidal influence and brackish water, in the form of tidal facies, shark teeth, and shrimp burrows. This demonstrates that the western shoreline of the Western Interior Sea was still within a few hundred kilometers even during the latest Cretaceous. The local K-T boundary is contained within a sandy channel deposit made up of stacked bars. Reworked Cretaceous fossils are preserved at the base of the channel complex, associated with mud rip-up clasts, and Paleocene mammal fossils are preserved in the upper portion of the bar.

The delta previously fed the deepwater Lewis Shale and shallow marine Fox Hills Formation. The Ferris followed behind as a system of lagoons, bays, and delta plain environments.

Vertebrate paleofauna 
In addition to a variety of dinosaurs, the following taxa are known from the Ferris Formation:

 Myledaphus
 Lissodus
 Cretorectolobus
 Phylodus
 Amia
 Lepisosteus
 Basilemys
 Adocus
 Leptochamops
 Brachychampsa

and a variety of Cretaceous and Paleocene multituberculates, marsupial, and placentals.

Ornithischians

Saurischians

See also 
 List of dinosaur-bearing rock formations
 Hell Creek Formation
 Fort Union Formation

References

Bibliography 
  
 
 

Geologic formations of Wyoming
Upper Cretaceous Series of North America
Paleogene United States
Maastrichtian Stage of North America
Danian Stage
Cretaceous–Paleogene boundary
Mudstone formations
Sandstone formations of the United States
Fluvial deposits
Deltaic deposits
Tidal deposits
Fossiliferous stratigraphic units of North America
Paleontology in Wyoming